Knockin' Boots may refer to:

"Knockin' Boots" (Candyman song)
"Knockin' Boots" (Luke Bryan song)

See also
Knockin' Boots 2001: A Sex Odyssey, a 2001 album by Candyman
"Knockin' Da Boots", a 1993 song by H-Town